Rainbow Raider (Roy G. Bivolo) is a fictional supervillain appearing in comic books by DC Comics. His real name is a pun based on the acronym "ROYGBIV", a mnemonic for the colors of a rainbow. He is a minor, though recurring, enemy of the Flash and other heroes.

Two incarnations of the Rainbow Raider appear in The Flash, with Roy G. Bivolo appearing in the first and ninth seasons, portrayed by Paul Anthony, and a female incarnation named Carrie Bates appearing in the seventh season, portrayed by Jona Xiao.

Publication history
Rainbow Raider first appeared in The Flash #286 (June 1980), and was created by Cary Bates and Don Heck. Bates said in a 2008 interview that "Rainbow Raider's color-blindness (as well as the color-emotion powers and origin) was an attempt on his part to emulate those classic Rogues' Gallery villain origins Bates enjoyed so much from the sixties".

Fictional character biography
As a child, Roy G. Bivolo always dreamed of a career as an artist, a lofty goal considering he was completely colorblind. He would often paint what he thought were beautiful pieces of art, and indeed showed great technical skill only to be told that it was made up of clashing colors. His father, an optometrist and genius in optical technology, swore he would find a cure for his son's disorder. Due to failing health, he was unable to complete his product, but instead created a sophisticated pair of goggles that would allow Roy to create beams of solid rainbow-colored light. On his death-bed, his father presents him with this gift, and it was not long before Roy found a sinister use for it.

Turning to crime because the world did not appreciate his art, Roy, now the Rainbow Raider, went on a crime spree focused mostly on art galleries, saying that if he could not appreciate the great works of art in them (due to his disability), then no one else would. During this time he often clashes with the Flash, and sparks a rivalry that would last several years. Some years later he would fight Booster Gold as well. Rainbow Raider becomes the mind-addled slave of a crimelord in one of many alternate futures within the Armageddon 2001 storyline. He is a central plot point in the first issue of the Underworld Unleashed storyline because even Neron, the demonic antagonist, considered him pathetic, indeed even calling him a "paramecium".

Rainbow Raider once traded opponents with Batman villain Doctor Double X after meeting a motivational therapist named Professor Andrea Wye. Both of them are defeated by Batman and Flash. He later becomes a minor enemy of the Justice League, appearing briefly at a villains gathering. Rainbow Raider later taking part in the riot in the super-hero prison of Belle Reve Penitentiary (he is quickly defeated by a single punch from Zauriel). During his time at Belle Reve, he was part of the Color Queens prison gang alongside Crazy Quilt, Doctor Light, Doctor Spectro, and Multi-Man.

Roy is slain by the villainess Blacksmith when she impaled him with his latest work of art.

During the Blackest Night storyline, Rainbow Raider is one of the many deceased characters temporarily reanimated as a zombie within the Black Lantern Corps.

In 2011, "The New 52" rebooted the DC universe. Roy uses the alias of Chroma, rather than Rainbow Raider. During the Forever Evil storyline, Chroma was present in Central City when Gorilla Grodd invaded the city with his army of gorillas. He, Girder, and Tar Pit saw Pied Piper defeated by Gorilla Grodd. After Gorilla Grodd punches Girder enough to crumble, Chroma runs away with Tar Pit. Gorilla Grodd later kills Chroma to serve as a warning to the other villains that the Gem Cities are his. Upon Solovar being chained up, the heads of Chroma and the Mayor of Central City are placed around him.<ref>The Flash (vol. 4) #23.1: Grodd. DC Comics.</ref>

Chroma later appears somehow alive and intact. He and Tar Pit are robbing jewelry stores until they are stopped by Flash.

Rainbow Raiders

Since Rainbow Raider's death, a team of color-themed supervillains have dubbed themselves the Rainbow Raiders in his honor.

Powers and abilities
Rainbow Raider's powers are derived entirely from the special goggles he wears, which allow him to project solid beams of rainbow-colored light he can either use offensively or as a slide for travel. In addition, he can coat people in certain colors of light to induce emotions (coating someone in blue light, for instance, would make them sad).

Reception
Heavy.com lists Rainbow Raider as one of the worst supervillains of all time. Francesco Marciuliano from Smosh.com ranked Rainbow Raider as having one of the worst supervillain gadgets of all time.

Other characters named Rainbow Raider
 Jonathan Kent posed as a supervillain called Rainbow Raider as part of a plot to get Superboy to capture gangster Vic Munster and his gang by using a hypnotic device on his helmet. Vic Munster later used the Rainbow Raider identity where he was defeated by Superboy.
 Dr. Quin (a villain from the first Dial H for Hero series) appears in House of Mystery #167 (June 1967) as a different Rainbow Raider. This version temporarily gave himself powers using a rare crystal that changed his body into different colors (slowly following the sequence of the rainbow). Depending on which color he was at the time, he would gain a different superpower: Red gave him a super-hot beam, Orange gave him an obscuring cloud, Yellow gave him the ability to drain energy and super powers, Green enables him to slow the bodies of others to the point of paralysis for an hour, and Violet shrinks people and objects for an hour. His Blue and Indigo powers are never shown. He also had a secret final color power called Ultra-Violet which made him invisible.

In other media
Television
 Two incarnations of Rainbow Raider appear in The Flash:
 Roy G. Bivolo appears in the first and ninth seasons, portrayed by Paul Anthony. This version is a metahuman capable of inciting rage in people via eye contact. Additionally, he is originally nicknamed Prism by Cisco Ramon, but Caitlin Snow suggests "Rainbow Raider", which he is referred to as from then on despite Ramon calling it lame. As of the ninth season, Bivolo has been recruited into the Red Death's Rogues.
 A female incarnation named Carrie Bates / Rainbow Raider 2.0 appears in the seventh season episode "Good-Bye Vibrations", portrayed by Jona Xiao. She is a former collections officer who was previously fired from three collection agencies for cancelling debts instead of collecting them and became a metahuman capable of inducing euphoria.
 Roy G. Bivolo appears in the Teen Titans Go! episode "Real Art", voiced by Scott O'Brien.

Film
Rainbow Raider appears in Teen Titans Go! To the Movies.

Video games
Rainbow Raider appears as a downloadable playable character in Lego Batman 3: Beyond Gotham as part of the "Rainbow" DLC pack.

Miscellaneous
 Rainbow Raider appears in Batman: The Brave and the Bold #14.
 Rainbow Raider appears in The Flash tie-in novel The Haunting of Barry Allen''.

References

External links
 Rainbow Raider at DC Comics Wiki
 Rainbow Raider at Comic Vine
 Seanbaby's Stupid Villain Showcase: Rainbow Raider

Characters created by Don Heck
Comics characters introduced in 1980
DC Comics supervillains
DC Comics supervillain teams
Fictional artists
Flash (comics) characters